The term "National Treasure" has been used in Japan to denote cultural properties since 1897.
The items are selected by the Ministry of Education, Culture, Sports, Science and Technology based on their "especially high historical or artistic value". This list presents 14 entries of residential structures from 15th-century feudal Muromachi period to the early modern 17th-century Edo period. The structures listed include teahouses, shoin, guest or reception halls and other rooms which are part of Japanese domestic architecture, while most of the structures are located in temples, one is a castle. In 2009, the early 20th century Akasaka Palace was designated as National Treasure in the category of "modern residences" (Meiji period and later). Because it is the only National Treasure in this category, it is listed together with the 14 pre-Meiji period structures.

The foundations for the design of today's traditional Japanese residential houses with tatami floors were established in the late Muromachi period and refined during the ensuing Momoyama period. 
Shoin-zukuri, a new architectural style influenced by zen Buddhism, developed during that time from the shinden-zukuri of earlier Heian period palaces and the subsequent residential style favored by the warrior class during the Kamakura period. The term , meaning study or drawing room, has been used to denote reception rooms in residences of the military elite as well as study rooms at monasteries. A main reception room is characterized by specific features: a recessed alcove (tokonoma); staggered shelves; built-in desks; and ornate sliding doors. The entrance hall (genkan) emerged as an element of residential architecture during the Momoyama period. The oldest extant shoin style building is the Tōgu-dō at Ginkaku-ji from 1485. Other representative examples of early shoin style, also called shuden, include two guest halls at Mii-dera. In the early Edo period, shoin-zukuri reached its peak and spread beyond the residences of the military elite. The more formal shoin-style of this period is apparent in the characteristics of Ninomaru Palace at Nijō Castle as well as the shoin at Nishi Hongan-ji.

The simpler style used in the architecture of tea houses for the tea ceremony developed in parallel with shoin-zukuri. In the 16th century Sen no Rikyū established dedicated  style teahouses characterized by their small size of typically two to eight mat, the use of natural materials, and rustic appearance. This teahouse style, exemplified by the Jo-an and Tai-an teahouses, was influenced by Japanese farmhouse style and the shoin style featuring tatami matted floors, recessed alcoves (tokonoma) and one or more ante chambers for preparations.

By the beginning of the Edo period, the features of the shoin and the teahouse styles began to be blended. The result was an informal version of the shoin style, called . Sukiya-zukuri has the characteristic decorative alcove and shelf, and utilizes woods such as cedar, pine, hemlock, bamboo, and cypress, often with rough surfaces including the bark. Compared to shoin style, roof eaves in the sukiya style bend downward. While the shoin style was suitable for ceremonial architecture, it became too imposing for residential buildings. Consequently, the less formal sukiya style was used for the mansions of the aristocracy and samurai after the beginning of the Edo period.
Examples of sukiya style architecture are found at the Katsura Imperial Villa and the Black Study Hall of Nishi Hongan-ji.

Statistics
In total there are 15 structures at ten compounds in five cities. Ten of these structures are located in Kyoto. The compound with most National Treasures of the residential building category is Nishi Hongan-ji, with three structures.

Usage
The table's columns (except for Remarks and Image) are sortable pressing the arrows symbols. The following gives an overview of what is included in the table and how the sorting works.
Name: name of the structure as registered in the Database of National Cultural Properties
Compound: name of the compound in which the structure is located
Remarks: architecture and general remarks including:
size measured in meters or ken (distance between pillars); "m × n" denotes the length (m) and width (n) of the structure, each measured in ken
architectural style (zukuri) and type of roofing
Date: period and year of the construction; The column entries sort by year. If only a period is known, they sort by the start year of that period.
Location: "town-name prefecture-name" and geo-coordinates of the structure; The column entries sort as "prefecture-name town-name".
Image: picture of the structure; If the image shows more than one structure, the respective structure is indicated by a blue rectangle.

Treasures

Notes

General

Architecture

References

Bibliography

External links

Residences
Residences